Tablet ( in Scots) is a medium-hard, sugary confection from Scotland. Tablet is usually made from sugar, condensed milk, and butter, which is boiled to a soft-ball stage and allowed to crystallise. It is often flavoured with vanilla and sometimes has nut pieces in it.

Tablet differs from fudge in that it has a brittle, grainy texture, where fudge is much softer. Well-made tablet is a medium-hard confection, not as soft as fudge, but not as hard as hard candy.

Commercially available tablet often uses fondant instead of the milk products. This produces a slightly less granular texture compared to the traditional home-made tablet, and is supposedly easier to prepare on a commercial scale.

History
According to The Scots Kitchen by F. Marian McNeill, tablet is noted in The Household Book of Lady Grisell Baillie in the early 18th century. The traditional recipe uses just sugar and cream. More modern recipes substitute condensed milk and butter for the cream, as cream has a tendency to burn when boiled.

Names
Tablet is sometimes referred to as Swiss Milk tablet (Swiss Milk being a term used by some for condensed milk) or butter tablet.

See also 
 Barfi
 Confiture de lait
 Dulce de leche
 Caramel
 Penuche

References

External links
 Tablet recipe

Scottish confectionery